Adventist congregations in Norway are a protestant free church in Norway.

History 

Adventism in Norway came from the Pietist revival (Haugean movement) started by Norwegian Lutheran preacher Hans Nielsen Hauge. Evidence suggests that four families in southern Norway became the nucleus of Norwegian Adventism after discovering the seventh-day Sabbath, though it is not believed to have been the result of contact from keepers of the Sabbath. Instead, it is believed that it was derived from their reading of the Bible. The Danish American John Gottlieb Matteson came to Norway in 1878 and began working as a missionary for the Seventh-day Adventists. Gottlieb composed the first Dano-Norwegian Adventist hymnal. It experienced good reception, leading to Matteson to go to Denmark and Kristiania (now Oslo) to preach. He later participated in the construction of the first church organized in Oslo. These were one of only few periodicals at the time and allowed members of the congregation to earn money through distribution. The church runs a number of private schools in Norway.

Congregation 
Early on in 1879, his congregation in Norway consisted of 34 people who were mostly working-class women. There were 652 Adventists in Norway in 1901, and 1,826 in 1921. In 2013, there were approximately 4,600 Adventists in Norway. As of June 30, 2018, the Adventist church had a total membership count of 4,535 people.

The Church is split into three districts:

 Northern Norway
 Western Norway
 Eastern Norway

Between these districts, as of 2013, there are 62 congregations and 43 churches.

On September 20, 2015, the Norwegian Union Conference Executive Committee of the Adventist Church voted to cease the ordination of both male and female pastors due to a disagreement on Biblical readings on ordination. The Seventh-Day Adventist Church in Norway pays pastoral employees the same wages and under the same terms regardless of gender.

Institutions 

Adventists in Norway own and operate the following institutions:

 Skogli Health and Rehabilitation Centre (Lillehammer)
 Tyrifjorden Upper Secondary School (Buskerud County)
 A Bible institute (Røyse)
 A publishing house (Røyse)
 Møsserød care home (Sandefjord)
 A senior citizen community centre (Bergen)
 11 primary schools
 Adventist Development and Relief Agency (ADRA) Norway

See also 
 Christianity in Norway
Australian Union Conference of Seventh-day Adventists
Seventh-day Adventist Church in Brazil
Seventh-day Adventist Church in Canada
Seventh-day Adventist Church in the People's Republic of China
Seventh-day Adventist Church in Colombia
Seventh-day Adventist Church in Cuba
Seventh-day Adventist Church in India
Italian Union of Seventh-day Adventist Churches
Seventh-day Adventist Church in Ghana
New Zealand Pacific Union Conference of Seventh-day Adventists
Seventh-day Adventist Church in Nigeria
Romanian Union Conference of Seventh-day Adventists
Seventh-day Adventist Church in Sweden
Seventh-day Adventist Church in Thailand
Seventh-day Adventist Church in Tonga
Seventh-day Adventists in Turks and Caicos Islands

References 

Protestantism in Norway
Norway
Seventh-day Adventist Church in Europe